Keisby is a small hamlet in the district of South Kesteven, in Lincolnshire, England. It is in the civil parish of Lenton, Keisby and Osgodby.

History

Keisby comes from an Old Norse term meaning "Kisi's farmstead or village". The village is mentioned in the Domesday account, and has had different spellings over the years, from Chisebi to Kisebi and Kysebi.

The English surname Kisby (and variants) is believed to originate from Keisby.

Modern times

Keisby is part of the Lenton, Keisby and Osgodby ecclesiastical parish, and The North Beltisloe Group of parishes in the Deanery of Beltisloe. As of 2014 the incumbent is the Revd Mike Doyle. There is no separate church, services taking place in the parish church at Lenton.

References

External links

"Keisby", Homepages.which.net

Hamlets in Lincolnshire
South Kesteven District